SMP Negeri 1 Blitar is a public junior high school which is located at Jalan A. Yani 8 Blitar, East Java, Indonesia. This school was established on August 19, 1946, occupying a former Dutch school building, the Hollandsch-Inlandsche School (HIS).

Notable alumni 
 Boediono
 Admiral Agus Suhartono

References

External links 
  Official site

Schools in Indonesia
Blitar
Schools in East Java